Veliki Tabor is a castle and museum in northwest Croatia, dating from the middle of 15th century. The castle's present appearance dates back to the 16th century.

Most of the castle was built by the Hungarian noble family of Ráttkay, in whose ownership it remained until 1793.

The castle is owned by the state, which manages it as a museum and a tourist site.

The results of the conservation research and the analysis of the archaeological finds indicate that the oldest part of Veliki Tabor was built in middle of 15th century.

The oldest part of the fort centre is its central part, the pentagonal castle, whose stylistic characteristics belong to the Late Gothic period.  The castle is surrounded by four semi-circular Renaissance towers connected by curtain walls and the walls of the northern entrance part.  The fort centre is surrounded by the outer defence wall (the distance from the easternmost to the westernmost points being about 225 metres) with a farm office, a Renaissance bastion, two semi-circular guardhouses (northern and southern), and the quadrangular entrance tower (present only on the archaeological level) through which the access road ran.

Since 2002, Veliki Tabor has been the venue of an international festival of short films.

The castle was closed to the public while undergoing renovations beginning 6 November 2008. Those renovations were completed in November 2011.

In the Middle Ages, Veliki Tabor belonged to Hermann II, Count of Celje. His son Fridrik fell in love with Veronika, a girl from a poor family. Hermann refused to accept a minor noblewoman as his daughter-in-law. He accused her of witchcraft and had her drowned. Frederick's rebellion against Hermann ended with Frederick's imprisonment.
Her body was walled up in Veliki Tabor. Veronika’s weeping can still be heard from the castle, according to some stories.

See also
Tentative list of World Heritage Sites in Croatia

References

External links 
 Veliki Tabor Castle
 Tabor Film Festival
 Medievalwall

Castles in Croatia
Museums in Croatia
Buildings and structures in Krapina-Zagorje County
Tourist attractions in Krapina-Zagorje County